In 356, after leaving Cologne, Roman Emperor Julian the Apostate wintered in Senonae (possibly modern Sens) in Gaul. Following desertions from his German federated troops, hostile Germanic warbands learned that his force was under-strength and moved to attack the town. However, lacking advanced siegecraft, they were not able to break into the town and could only prevent Julian from venturing outside the walls. After a month, they withdrew.

Finally, after a month the savages withdrew crestfallen, muttering that they had been silly and foolish to have contemplated the blockade of the city. But — a thing to be regarded as a shameful situation — while Caesar was in jeopardy, Marcellus, master of the horse, although he was stationed in neighbouring posts, postponed sending him reinforcements; whereas even if the city alone was endangered, to say nothing of the prince's presence there, it ought to have been saved from the hardships of blockade by the intervention of a large force.

References

Senonae
Senonae
356
Senonae
350s in the Roman Empire
4th century in Roman Gaul
Julian (emperor)